In graph theory, circular coloring is a kind of coloring that may be viewed as a refinement of the usual graph coloring. The circular chromatic number of a graph , denoted  can be given by any of the following definitions, all of which are equivalent (for finite graphs).

In an oriented graph, declare the imbalance of a cycle  to be  divided by the minimum of the number of edges directed clockwise and the number of edges directed counterclockwise. Define the imbalance of the oriented graph to be the maximum imbalance of a cycle.

It is relatively easy to see that  (especially using 1 or 2), but in fact .  It is in this sense that we view circular chromatic number as a refinement of the usual chromatic number.  

Coloring is dual to the subject of nowhere-zero flows and indeed, circular coloring has a natural dual notion: circular flows.

Circular complete graphs 

For integers  such that , the circular complete graph  (also known as a circular clique) is the graph with vertex set  and edges between elements at distance 
That is vertex i is adjacent to:

 is just the complete graph , while  is the cycle graph 

A circular coloring is then, according to the second definition above, a homomorphism into a circular complete graph. Moreover, the homomorphism order among them refines the order given by complete graphs into a dense order, corresponding to rational numbers . For example

or equivalently

The example on the figure can be interpreted as a homomorphism from the flower snark  into , which comes earlier than  corresponding to the fact that

See also
Rank coloring

References
.
.
.
Graph coloring
Parametric families of graphs
Regular graphs